Esports at the 2021 Southeast Asian Games took place at National Convention Center in Hanoi, Vietnam from 13 to 22 May 2022. It will be the second esports contest as a medal event in a multi-sport competition sanctioned by the International Olympic Committee.

Ten medals are contested in esports which consists of eight games and ten events. There are two games where two events are matched, League of Legends: Wild Rift will contest men's and women's team and PlayerUnknown's Battlegrounds Mobile will contest individual and team matches. The games are accredited by the Vietnam Recreational and Electronic Sports Association.

Regulations on age restriction stipulates that players should be at least 18 years old. In the previous edition, players at least 12 years old were eligible to compete.

Medal table

Medal summary

PC

Mobile

References 

Esports at the 2021 Southeast Asian Games